This is a list of festivals in Bangladesh.

Bangladesh is a country of colourful celebrations. The people celebrate their faith, life, liberty, nature, elation, and achievements round the year through a wide variety of fairs and festivals, organized with enthusiasm and intricate details. Some Bengali fairs and festivals have a recorded history of over 2000 years. Festivals in Bangladesh fall into four major categories: religious festivals, national events, cultural festivals and tribal festivals. Although a few festivals are primarily meant for particular sections of the population, all the festivals have now attained universal reach throughout the country.

Religious observance

Muslim
 Eid ul-Fitr - on the 1st day of Shawwal month of the lunar Islamic calendar.
 Eid ul-Adha - on the 10th day of Dhu al-Hijjah month of the Islamic calendar.
 Chaand Raat - on the 29th or 30th night of Ramadan month of the Islamic calendar.
 Ashura - on the 10th day of Muharram in the Islamic calendar.
 Eid-e-Meeladun Nabi – The Birth of the Prophet Muhammad
 Shab-e-Qadr 
 Shab-e-Baraat
 Bishwa Ijtema

Hindu
 Durga Puja - from the 2nd to the 7th day of Kartik month of the Bengali calendar.
 Krishna Janmashtami - celebration of the birth of Lord Krishna
 Dolyatra
 Ratha Yatra, the most popular being Dhamrai Rathayatra.
 Kali Puja
 Saraswati Puja
 Ashtami Snan on Chaitra Shukla Paksha Ashtami (ninth day during the waxing phase of moon in Chaitra Month) as per Hindu Lunar Calendar

Buddhist
 Buddha Purnima - Buddha's Birthday
 Madhu Purnima
 Kathin Chibardan - offering of woven robe made of cotton to monks and nuns.

Christian
 Boro Din or Christmas - on 25 December of the Gregorian calendar.
 Easter Sunday

Patriotic and National Observances
 Language Movement Day - (International Mother Language Day); Colours worn:  
 Genocide Remembrance Day; Colours worn:  
 National day of mourning (15 August); Colours worn:  
 Independence Day; Colours worn:   
 Armed Forces Day
 Martyred Intellectuals Day; Colours worn:  
 Victory Day; Colours worn:

Cultural festivals

General
 Rokeya Day
 Rabindra Jayanti
 Nazrul Jayanti

Music
 Dhaka World Music Festival (music)
 Bengal Classical Music Festival
International Folk Festival

Folk
 Pahela Baishakh - on the 1st day of the Bengali calendar and summer festival; also called Bangla Noboborsho; Colours worn: 
 Boshonto Utshob - Spring festival also known as Pohela Falgun; Colours worn: 
 Nabanna - Winter and harvest festival; Colours worn: 
 Borsha Utshob - Monsoon festival; Colours worn: 
 Nouka Baich - Boat racing festivals held after the monsoon when rivers are filled

Others

 Bengal Original Culture Festival
 Cinemaking International Film Festival
 Dhaka Festival
 Dhaka Art Summit
 Hay Festival Dhaka
 Dhaka Fashion Week
 Dhaka International Film Festival
 Chobi Mela International Photography Festival
 CRACK International Art Camp
 International Children's Film Festival Bangladesh
 Bioscope Children's Photography Festival

Fairs 

 Ekushey Book Fair - in Dhaka on the month of February of the Gregorian calendar.
 Dhaka International Trade Fair
 National Tree Fair - Month-long National Tree Plantation Campaign and Tree Fair.
 National Fisheries Week and Fish Fair - Week-long National Fiash Trade and Fair.

Local events

 Shakrain - in Dhaka at the end of the Poush of the Bengali calendar.
 Jatiya Pitha Utsab - National Pitha (Cake) Festival.
 Joy Bangla Concert - annual concert to mark the 7 March Speech of Bangabandhu Sheikh Mujib.
 Nouka Baich
 Bisu Mela

Public holidays
 Public holidays in Bangladesh

References

 
 
Festivals
Bangladesh
Bangladesh
Festivals